Vinny Cerrato is a former executive for the San Francisco 49ers and Washington Redskins of the National Football League (NFL). He served as the Redskins' de facto general manager throughout the 2000s. Cerrato has also been an analyst and film actor.

Biography

Playing career
Cerrato played college football at Iowa State University, where he played quarterback and wide receiver.

Football Career
Oakland Invaders

Cerrato signed a contract with the USFL Oakland Invaders in January 1983, however, was cut in training camp a month later.

University of Minnesota
Cerrato started his career as a graduate assistant for the Minnesota Golden Gophers from 1983 to 1984, and he was promoted to recruiting coordinator in 1985, before leaving for Notre Dame.

Notre Dame
Before the NFL, Cerrato served as the football recruiting coordinator under Lou Holtz at the University of Notre Dame. During that time, the Irish played in four Bowl games and won the 1988 NCAA National Championship.

San Francisco 49ers
Cerrato joined the San Francisco 49ers in 1991 as a scout, and later became the team's director of college scouting in June 1992, helping to draft players such as Ted Washington, Ricky Watters, Dana Stubblefield and Bryant Young. In 1994, the 49ers won Super Bowl XXIX. It was also this during time that Cerrato appeared as an actor in the 1994 film Kindergarten Ninja. In February 1995, Cerrato was promoted to director of player personnel, overseeing all college scouting and draft activities as well as pro scouting of NFL players and opponents.

Washington Redskins
Cerrato was hired by the Washington Redskins in 1999.  During this time, he acquired older big name stars like Bruce Smith, Deion Sanders, Irving Fryar, Jeff George, and Mark Carrier. He was then fired by Marty Schottenheimer in 2001. During his brief hiatus from the Redskins, Cerrato worked for ESPN as a college analyst. Cerrato was subsequently rehired by Daniel Snyder in 2002 as their vice president of football operations. On December 17, 2009, Cerrato resigned from the team. Cerrato and his tenure as General Manager has been frequently regarded as a failure by peer evaluators, and the media. Since then, Cerrato has appeared on various sports talk radio shows in the Washington and Baltimore area.

References

 
 

Year of birth missing (living people)
Living people
American football quarterbacks
American football wide receivers
American male film actors
Iowa State Cyclones football players
Minnesota Golden Gophers football coaches
National Football League general managers
Notre Dame Fighting Irish football coaches
San Francisco 49ers executives
San Francisco 49ers scouts
Washington Redskins executives
People from Flushing, Queens